"Raupatu" (English: "Confiscated") is a Māori language song by New Zealand thrash metal band Alien Weaponry. Released as a single in early 2017, it won the Maioha Award at the 2017 APRA Silver Scroll Awards.

Background and composition 

The song, along with many of the band's early releases, are based on discussions the de Jong brothers had with their father, as he discussed their whakapapa during car journeys. The song discusses the New Zealand land confiscations of the 1800s in the Waikato, Bay of Plenty and Taranaki regions, the chiefs who resisted these confiscations, and tino rangatiratanga, kāwanatanga and sovereignty. The song features an excerpt from Te Tiriti o Waitangi, the Māori language version of the 1840 Treaty of Waitangi, which discusses sovereignty in different terms to how it is expressed in the English language document.

The song was produced by Tom Larkin of the New Zealand band Shihad, and was recorded at Roundhead Studios in Auckland, New Zealand

Release 

The song was first released on the band's BandCamp store on 31 January 2017, with the song's music video being released a day later.The song had a wider release across most digital platforms on 6 February, to coincide with Waitangi Day.

Reception

"Raupatu" had a strong response online, and was one of the reasons the band was noticed internationally. The song won the Maioha Award at the 2017 APRA Silver Scroll Awards, celebrating music released in Te Reo Māori. During the ceremony, the song was covered by taonga pūoro musicians Ariana Tikao, James Webster, Alistair Fraser, and Horomona Horo.

Tracklist 

Digital download
"Raupatu"  – 3:37
"PC Bro"  – 3:46

Credits and personnel
Credits adapted from the Tū album booklet.

Henry De Jong – drums, vocals, songwriting
Lewis De Jong – guitar, vocals, songwriting
Paddy Hill – recording
Tom Larkin – producer
Scott Seabright – recording
Ethan Trembath – bass guitar, vocals, songwriting

References

2017 singles
2017 songs
APRA Award winners
Thrash metal songs
Māori-language songs
New Zealand songs